Kohlhase is a German surname. Notable people with the surname include:

 Charles Kohlhase (born 1935), American aerospace engineer
 Chris Kohlhase (1967–2015), New Zealand softball player
 Eddie Kohlhase, New Zealand softball player
 Hans Kohlhase (c. 1500 – 1540), German historical figure
 Marilyn Kohlhase (born 1953) New Zealand curator and arts administrator
 Michael Kohlhase (born 1964), German computer scientist
 Sebastian Kohlhase (born 1942), Samoan cricketer
 Walther Kohlhase (1908–1993), German painter

See also 
 Kohlhaase
 13801 Kohlhase, main-belt asteroid

German-language surnames